The 1870 Plymouth by-election was held on 15 August 1870.  The by-election was held due to the incumbent Liberal MP, Sir Robert Porrett Collier, becoming Recorder of Bristol.  It was retained unopposed by Collier.

References

1870 in England
Elections in Plymouth, Devon
1870 elections in the United Kingdom
By-elections to the Parliament of the United Kingdom in Devon constituencies
19th century in Plymouth, Devon
Unopposed ministerial by-elections to the Parliament of the United Kingdom in English constituencies
August 1870 events